Andrej Koželj (born 27 November 1955) is a Slovenian alpine skier. He competed in three events at the 1976 Winter Olympics, representing Yugoslavia.

References

1955 births
Living people
Slovenian male alpine skiers
Olympic alpine skiers of Yugoslavia
Alpine skiers at the 1976 Winter Olympics
Sportspeople from Maribor